Turandot at the Forbidden City was a 1998 live production of Giacomo Puccini's opera Turandot directed by Zhang Yimou.

The opera was performed by Giovanna Casolla, Audrey Stottler, and Sharon Sweet alternating as Princess Turandot; Kristján Jóhannsson, Sergej Larin and Lando Bartolini as Calàf; and Barbara Frittoli,  Angela-Maria Blasi and Barbara Hendricks as Liù, with Zubin Mehta conducting the Maggio Musicale Fiorentino. A film was made of the performance with Casolla, Larin and Frittoli. In the United States, the film was aired as part of PBS' Great Performances.

References

External links

Operas
Films based on operas
Opera in China
1998 films
Giacomo Puccini
1990s musical films
Opera films
Films based on works by Carlo Gozzi
Works based on Turandot (Gozzi)